Kambiz Norouzi (کامبیز نوروزی in Persian) is a lawyer, university professor, legal advisor of the Association of Iranian Journalists, in which role he spoke out against the closure of newspapers in 2002, and lecturer at Center of Media Education in Iran.

Arrest and Imprisonment
Norouzi was arrested during the protests following the disputed June 2009 Iranian presidential election, and in November 2009 was sentenced to two years imprisonment and 74 lashes for conspiracy against national security, spreading anti-government propaganda and disrupting public order.

References

External Links
 Kambiz Norouzi's Arrest and Imprisonment

Living people
21st-century Iranian lawyers
Iranian writers
Year of birth missing (living people)